Hamadoun Dicko (1924 in Diona, Mali – 1964 in Kidal, Mali) was a Malian politician who was elected to the French National Assembly in 1951 .

References 
Assemblée nationale - Biographie de Hamadoun Dicko

1924 births
1964 deaths
People from Mopti Region
People of French West Africa
Malian politicians
French Section of the Workers' International politicians
Deputies of the 2nd National Assembly of the French Fourth Republic
Deputies of the 3rd National Assembly of the French Fourth Republic
Deputies of the 1st National Assembly of the French Fifth Republic